The Medicine Hat Cubs are a Canadian Junior B ice hockey team located in Medicine Hat, Alberta. They play in the Heritage Junior B Hockey League, from the Medicine Hat Kinplex.

History
The Cubs were founded in 1973 into the Heritage Junior B Hockey League. In their fifth year, 1977–78, they won the league championship for the first time, repeating as champions the next season. In the 1980s and 90s the Cubs won the league championship again in 1980–81, 85–86, 87–88, 90–91, 91–92, 92–93, 94–95, 95–96, 99–00 and 00–01. In this time two Cubs players went on to play in the National Hockey League (Blaine Lacher and Murray Craven) Since the 2001 season the Cubs have more or less struggled compared to former seasons, including some highly rough recent years. The Cubs took a mid-season leave of absence in January 2016 after deciding not to finish out the 2015–16 season with too few players. The Cubs were set to host the 2020 ATB FINANCIAL JUNIOR B PROVINCIALS April 2–5, 2020 but due to the COVID-19 outbreak, Provincials were cancelled.

Recent season-by-season record

(accurate as of the 2018–2019 season)

Retired numbers

 1 – Blaine Lacher
 9 – Murray Craven
 12 – Justin Bremer

See also
List of ice hockey teams in Alberta

References

External links
Official Website of the Medicine Hat Cubs

Ice hockey teams in Alberta
1973 establishments in Alberta
Ice hockey clubs established in 1973